Alto Campoo is a ski resort in the Cantabrian Mountains of northern Spain. The resort is located in the Cantabrian comarca of Campoo.
The source of the river Ebro is near the resort in the town of Fontibre.

Resort

With   of marked pistes, it is one of the biggest resorts of the Cantabrian Mountains.

From there a four-seat chair lift provides the main access for the resort. The resort itself occupies a high mountain valley. The valley is accessible by car, with a parking and service area at its base from where the lifts depart.

Lifts
Many of the resort's lifts are modern and of high capacity. The resort has:

 5 chair lifts.
 8 ski tows.

Pistes
The resort offers 23 pistes of different difficulties:
 4 beginners. 
  9 easy.
  10 intermediate.

Services

 2 restaurants.
 1 skiing school.
 1 snow gardens for children.
 1 kindergarten
 1 ski hiring stores.

Vuelta a España
The Alto Campoo climb has been used in four stages of the Vuelta a España and the Colombian rider José Antonio Agudelo Gómez was the first man to climb the mountain in the Vuelta.

Appearances in Vuelta a España (since 1985)

References

External links
 http://www.altocampoo.com - Official resort site.
, Natura 2000

Cantabrian Mountains
Ski areas and resorts in Spain
Sport in Cantabria
Buildings and structures in Cantabria
Tourist attractions in Cantabria